Troponin I is a cardiac and skeletal muscle protein family. It is a part of the troponin protein complex, where it binds to actin in thin myofilaments to hold the actin-tropomyosin complex in place. Troponin I prevents myosin from binding to actin in relaxed muscle. When calcium binds to the troponin C, it causes conformational changes which lead to dislocation of troponin I. Afterwards, tropomyosin leaves the binding site for myosin on actin leading to contraction of muscle. The letter I is given due to its inhibitory character. It is a useful marker in the laboratory diagnosis of heart attack.  It occurs in different plasma concentration but the same circumstances as troponin T - either test can be performed for confirmation of cardiac muscle damage and laboratories usually offer one test or the other.

Three paralogs with unique tissue-specific expression patterns are expressed in humans, listed below with their locations and OMIM accessions:
 Slow-twitch skeletal muscle isoform troponin I, TNNI1 (1q31.3)
 Fast-twitch skeletal muscle isoform troponin I, TNNI2 (11p15.5)
 Cardiac troponin I, TNNI3 (19q13.4)

cTnI
Cardiac troponin I, often denoted as cTnI, is presented in cardiac muscle tissue by a single isoform with a molecular weight of 23.9 kDa. It consists of 209 amino acid residues. The theoretical pI of cTnI is 9.05. cTnI differs from other troponins due to its N-terminal extension of 26 amino acids. This extension contains two serines, residues 23 and 24, which are phosphorylated by protein kinase A in response to beta-adrenergic stimulation and important in increasing the inotropic response. Phosphorylation of cTnI changes the conformation of the protein and modifies its interaction with other troponins as well as the interaction with anti-TnI antibodies. These changes alter the myofilament response to calcium, and are of interest in targeting heart failure.  Multiple reaction monitoring of human cTnI has revealed that there are 14 phosphorylation sites and the pattern of phosphorylation observed these sites is changed in response to disease. cTnI has been shown to be phosphorylated by protein kinase A, protein kinase C, protein kinase G, and p21-activated kinase 3.

A significant part of cTnI released into the patient's blood stream is phosphorylated. For more than 15 years cTnI has been known as a reliable marker of cardiac muscle tissue injury. It is considered to be more sensitive and significantly more specific in the diagnosis of myocardial infarction than the "golden marker" of the last decades – CK-MB, as well as total creatine kinase, myoglobin and lactate dehydrogenase isoenzymes.

Troponin I is not entirely specific for myocardial damage secondary to infarction. Other causes of raised troponin I include chronic kidney failure, heart failure, subarachnoid haemorrhage and pulmonary embolus.

In veterinary medicine, increased cTnI has been noted from myocardial damage after ionophore toxicity in cattle.

High-sensitivity troponin I testing 
The high sensitive troponin I test is a chemiluminescence microparticle immunoassay, which is used to quantitatively determine cardiac troponin I in human plasma and serum.  The test can be used to aid in diagnosing myocardial infarction, as a prognostic marker in patients with acute coronary syndrome and to identify the risk (low, moderate and elevated) of future cardiovascular diseases such as myocardial infarction, heart failure, ischaemic stroke, coronary revascularisation, and cardiovascular death in asymptomatic people.

High sensitive troponin I has been proven to have superior clinical performance versus high sensitivity troponin T in patients with renal impairment  and skeletal muscle disease. It is also not affected by diurnal rhythm, which is important when the test is used as a screening tool for CVD.

Prognostic use 
The basis for the modern prevention of CVD lies in the prognosis of the risk of the development of myocardial infarction, stroke or heart failure in the future. Currently, most prognostic models of cardiovascular risk (European SCORE scale, Framingham scale, etc.) are based on the evaluation of traditional risk factors of CVD. This stratification system is indirect and has several limitations, which include the inaccurate forecasting of risks. These risk scales are heavily dependent on the age of the person. Research data bears evidence that the high sensitive troponin I test enables higher precision in determining the cardiovascular risk group of the individual, if used together with the results of clinical and diagnostic examinations.

- High sensitive troponin I test can help to proactively identify individuals at high cardiovascular risk long before symptoms appear. The higher the troponin I level in asymptomatic individuals, the higher the likelihood if subclinical myocardial injury.

- It provides greater accuracy in identifying persons at low CVD risk.

- Troponin I is a biomarker that responds to treatment interventions. Reductions in troponin I levels proved to reduce the risk of future CVD.

- High sensitive troponin I used as a screening tool to assess a persons cardiovascular risk and has the potential to reduce the growing cost burden of the healthcare system.

The efficiency of  the new test has been confirmed by data collected by international studies with the participation of more than 100,000 subjects.

The ability of high sensitive troponin I to identify individual’s cardiovascular risk in asymptomatic people enables physicians to use it in outpatient/ambulatory practice during preventive check-ups, complex health examinations, or examinations of patients with known risk factors. Knowing which cardiovascular risk group a person belongs to allows physicians to promptly determine patient care tactics well before the development of symptoms, and to prevent adverse outcomes.

Indications for testing 
High sensitive troponin I test is recommended for asymptomatic women and men to assess and stratify their cardiovascular risk.

Individuals may or may not have known established cardio-vascular risk factors:

 high blood pressure;
 obesity;
 congenital factors, history of cardiovascular diseases;
 pre-diabetes, diabetes;
 sedentary lifestyle;
 metabolic syndrome;
 dislipidaemia;
 smoking.

Incorporating the high sensitive troponin I test into initial screening will improve the prediction of future CV events and help individuals be more compliant with lifestyle changes and possible medication recommended by their physician.

This might be a step forward for personalized preventive medicine, being especially relevant at an individual level, when clinicians need to weigh the importance of each risk factor and determine if the person needs therapy in addition to lifestyle advice.

The precise frequency of examinations is not pre-determined; it depends on the specific case, risk category and individual characteristics of a patient. The test may be added to the check-up programs or used as a stand along in conjunction with other clinical and diagnostic findings.

History 
Troponin was discovered in 1965. It was initially named heart myofibrillar apparatus protein component but was later renamed troponin. In 1971, Grieser and Gergely proved that troponin complex consists of three components, which, considering their specific properties, were named TnC, TnI and TnT. Over the following ten years, several groups of researchers started to demonstrate interest in the research of troponin, and the awareness of these proteins increased rapidly. When, finally, the amino acid sequences of troponin isoforms were determined, the opportunity to research functionally significant regions appeared.

See also
 Troponin
 Troponin T
 Troponin C
 Sliding filament model

References

External links
 

Troponin